Fanil Ramayevich Sungatulin (born 24 December 2001) is a Russian football player who plays for FC Ural Yekaterinburg.

Club career
He made his debut in the Russian Football National League for FC Spartak-2 Moscow on 25 May 2019 in a game against PFC Sochi.

He made his debut in the Russian Premier League for FC Spartak Moscow on 21 May 2022 in a game against FC Khimki.

On 21 June 2022, Sungatullin joined FC Ural Yekaterinburg on loan. On 7 February 2023, the transfer to Ural was made permanent.

Career statistics

References

External links
 
 
 

2001 births
People from Yarkovsky District
Sportspeople from Tyumen Oblast
Living people
Russian footballers
Russia youth international footballers
Association football midfielders
FC Spartak-2 Moscow players
FC Spartak Moscow players
FC Ural Yekaterinburg players
Russian First League players
Russian Premier League players
Russian Second League players